As in most other countries, minimum ages apply in Romania for various activities involving minors.

General
The following minimum legal ages apply in Romania:
 Legal age to have sexual intercourse: 16
 Legal age of criminal responsibility: 14
 Legal age to buy tobacco products: 18
 Legal age for voting: 18
 Legal age to be elected in the Chamber of Deputies: 23
 Legal age to be elected in the Senate: 33
 Legal age to be elected in the office of President: 35
 Legal age for employment: 15
 Legal driving age: 16 (A1/AM & B1 licenses), 18 (All vehicles excluding some categories such as A for motorcycles)
 legal age for Army service, voluntary since 2007, is: 18

Minors
Under Romanian law, minors are persons under 18. Nevertheless, civil law differentiates between minors under 14, who are completely devoid of legal capacity, and minors age 14-17, who have a limited form of legal capacity. Emancipation of minors under the law occurs either through marriage or by court order, if there are strong reasons, from age 16.

Marriageable age
The marriageable age is defined in Art 272 of the Civil Code of Romania. This article sets a minimum age of marriage of  18, which can, in special circumstances, be lowered to 16. The marriageable age is the same for boys and girls, as Law nr. 288/2007 equalized the marriageable age of the sexes.

Minors and religious freedom
Minors can choose their own religion from age 14. (Art. 491, 2) Minors under 14 are guided religiously by their parents, however they can not be forcefully made to follow a religion.(Art. 491, 1)

Employment
Minors can work from age 15. Minors aged 15 need their parents' consent, while those aged 16–17 do not need their parents' consent. There are, however, restrictions on the type of jobs that minors under 18 can practice. (Art 13 of the Labour Code).

References

Society of Romania
Romania